The 2014 LPGA of Japan Tour was the 47th season of the LPGA of Japan Tour, the professional golf tour for women operated by the Ladies Professional Golfers' Association of Japan. It consisted of 37 golf tournaments, all played in Japan. Ahn Sun-ju won five tournaments and was the leading money winner with earnings of ¥153,075,741. It was her third money title in five years.

Schedule
The number in parentheses after winners' names show the player's total number wins in official money individual events on the LPGA of Japan Tour, including that event.

Events in bold are majors.
(a) denotes amateur

The Mizuno Classic is co-sanctioned with the LPGA Tour.

External links
 

LPGA of Japan Tour
LPGA of Japan Tour
LPGA of Japan Tour